The Valea Largă is a small river in Cluj County, western Romania. It is a left tributary of the river Arieș. It flows through the municipalities Frata, Ceanu Mare, Tritenii de Jos and Viișoara, and joins the Arieș at Viișoara. It is fed by several smaller streams, including Tritul and Valea Lată.

References

Rivers of Romania
Rivers of Cluj County